The 2022–23 season is the 4th year of competitive football played by Odisha FC and the team's 4th in the Indian Super League. They are currently in sixth position in the league.

Odisha had a perfect start in Durand Cup, they Reached the Quarter-finals by winning all group stage matches without conceding a single goal. But in the quarter-finals, they lost against the year champions Bengaluru.

As of now, twenty-five players made at least one appearance for the club. four players featured in all competitive matches. Diego Maurício is the club's top scorer in all competitions.

Review and events

Preseason and Durand Cup
Odisha FC brought back head coach Josep Gombau who enjoyed an excellent two-year spell at the club on June 8. He started to rebuild the team by bringing a new set of players. He stated that the team composition and their play would be different, so they wanted new players. He also confirmed that they retain no foreign players from last season. On July 1, They announced the launch of Odisha FC Women team.

Odisha made their Durand Cup debut in Group D. They won their first game with 6 goals against NorthEast United. Odisha defeated Kerala Blasters, Sudeva Delhi and Army Green in their remaining group matches without conceding a single goal. But in the quarter-finals, they lost against Bengaluru, who later won the tournament.

Indian Super League
Odisha was handed an away fixture in their first match, facing defending premiers Jamshedpur. Odisha won the game 3-2. But in next match Mumbai City FC notched a 2-0 win over them in a tightly contested affair with a Shubham Sarangi own goal and a Bipin Singh late strike. In their first home match, Odisha FC made another stunning comeback to register second win of the season. After the first half Kerala Blasters was leading with a goal, but in the second half Jerry Mawihmingthanga equalised and substitute Pedro Martín won it for the Juggernauts. In next match they picked their second home win as well by beating Bengaluru FC. Nandhakumar Sekar scored the game's only goal. But an early goal sink them to their second defeat of the season against Hyderabad FC. Then they nabbed three consecutive wins against East Bengal, Chennaiyin and NorthEast united. But in the next match, The Juggernauts were reduced to ten men in the 65th minute when Nandhakumar Sekar was shown a second yellow and FC Goa made the visitors pay with all three goals coming after. In the next match, Odisha FC and ATK Mohun Bagan shared the points in the season’s first goalless draw to complete Odisha's first half of the season with six wins and one draw.

Match results

Legend

League

Durand Cup

Player details
Head Coach Josep Gombau used 25 players in all competitions till now. Pedro Martín, Diego Maurício, Jerry Mawihmingthanga and Thoiba Singh featured in all twelve league and five Durand Cup matches. Antonio D'Silva Played in two Durand cup matches but didn't include in League Squad. With five goals in the league and seven goals in all competitions, Diego Maurício is the club's top scorer. He raised his most league goal for Odisha FC record to fifteen goals. Eight players scored at least one goal till now and one opposition player scored their own goal. Amrinder Singh earned two clean sheets from twelve league matches and raised ISL's record to thirty-seven.

|}

Transfers 
Josep Gombau after being signed as the head coach stated that the team composition, and how they play, all will be different so they wanted new players. They didn't retain any foreign players. Signed 4 players from Spanish teams, Osama Malik from an Australian club Perth Glory and Diego Maurício returned from Mumbai City. Even though Kamaljit Singh has signed an extension, he later transferred to East Bengal. They signed 15 players in total, transferred 17 players out and retained 17 players from last season. Vinit Rai continued on loan in Mumbai City.

Transfers In

Transfers Out

Notes

References

Odisha FC seasons
Odisha FC